The criteria for determining who has achieved human spaceflight vary. The majority of people who have flown into space have done so by entering Earth orbit. This list includes persons meeting all three criteria, in separate subdivisions.

The flags indicate the space traveler's nationality at the time of their flight or flights. In cases of dual citizenship, the space traveler is listed under their primary residence. A secondary list appended to the entry for the Soviet Union shows the birth countries of space travelers not born in Russia. A similar list after the entry for the United States shows the birth countries of space travelers who are or were citizens of the U.S. but were born elsewhere. Flags shown in the secondary lists are those in use at the time of the space travelers' birth.

Names in italic are space travelers who are not part of any national astronaut program or astronaut corps (Toyohiro Akiyama, Helen Sharman, the Space Adventures customers and the sub-orbital SpaceShipOne and Blue Origin pilots).

Statistics 
, people from 44 countries have traveled in space. 622 people have reached Earth orbit. 628 have reached the altitude of space according to the FAI definition of the boundary of space, and 565 people have reached the altitude of space according to the American definition. 24 people have traveled beyond low Earth orbit and either circled, orbited, or walked on the Moon.

Of the 37 countries whose citizens have traveled into Earth orbit, 25 have flown a single space traveler, and four others (Belgium, Bulgaria, the Netherlands, and the United Kingdom) have flown two each. 94% of all space travelers have been contributed by the following eight nations:

1 Includes 72 Soviet cosmonauts and 49 Russian cosmonauts.
2 Includes both national space programme activity and European Space Agency participation.
3 Includes astronauts from the Federal Republic of Germany and the German Democratic Republic.

Suborbital space fliers

Australia
The following person flew or was launched into the upper atmosphere, above , which counts as a space flight by Fédération Aéronautique Internationale guidelines:

 Chris Boshuizen — Blue Origin NS-18 (2021)

Brazil
The following person flew or was launched into the upper atmosphere, above , which counts as a space flight by Fédération Aéronautique Internationale guidelines:

 Victor Correa Hespanha — Blue Origin NS-21 (2022)

Canada
The following person flew or was launched into the upper atmosphere, above , which counts as a space flight by Fédération Aéronautique Internationale guidelines:

 William Shatner — Blue Origin NS-18, oldest person in space (2021)

Egypt
The following Egyptians flew or was launched into the upper atmosphere, above , which counts as a space flight by Fédération Aéronautique Internationale guidelines:

 Sara Sabry  — Blue Origin NS-22 (2022)

Portugal
The following person flew or was launched into the upper atmosphere, above , which counts as a space flight by Fédération Aéronautique Internationale guidelines:

 Mário Ferreira — Blue Origin NS-22 (2022)

Union of Soviet Socialist Republics
The Soviet Union never launched a spaceflight intended as suborbital.  The following persons were launched aboard Soyuz 7K-T No.39 (also Soyuz 18a), intended as orbital, but which was forced to abort before reaching orbit, after reaching suborbital space.
 Vasily Lazarev (1928–1990) — Soyuz 18a (1975); also orbited aboard Soyuz 12 (1973)
 Oleg Grigoryevich Makarov (1933–2003) — Soyuz 18a (1975); also orbited aboard Soyuz 12 (1973), Soyuz 27 (1978), Soyuz 26 (1978) and Soyuz T-3 (1980)

United States
The following persons flew or were launched into the upper atmosphere, above , which counts as a space flight by Fédération Aéronautique Internationale guidelines:
 Alan Shepard, first American in space — Mercury-Redstone 3 (1961); also orbited and flew to the Moon aboard Apollo 14 (1971)
 Joseph A. Walker, USAF X-15 astronaut — X-15 Flight 90 (1963) and X-15 Flight 91 (1963)
 Gus Grissom — Mercury-Redstone 4 (1961); also orbited aboard Gemini 3 (1965)
 Mike Melvill — SpaceShipOne flight 15P (2004), SpaceShipOne flight 16P (2004).
 Brian Binnie — SpaceShipOne flight 17P (2004)
 Jeff Bezos — Blue Origin NS-16 (2021)
 Mark Bezos — Blue Origin NS-16 (2021)
 Wally Funk — Blue Origin NS-16 (2021)
 Audrey Powers — Blue Origin NS-18 (2021)
 Glen de Vries — Blue Origin NS-18 (2021)
Laura Shepard Churchley — Blue Origin NS-19 (2021)
Michael Strahan — Blue Origin NS-19 (2021)
Dylan Taylor — Blue Origin NS-19 (2021)
Evan Dick — Blue Origin NS-19 (2021), Blue Origin NS-21 (2022)
Lane Bess — Blue Origin NS-19 (2021)
Cameron Bess — Blue Origin NS-19 (2021)
Marty Allen — Blue Origin NS-20 (2022)
Sharon Hagle — Blue Origin NS-20 (2022)
Marc Hagle — Blue Origin NS-20 (2022)
Jim Kitchen — Blue Origin NS-20 (2022)
George Nield — Blue Origin NS-20 (2022)
Gary Lai — Blue Origin NS-20 (2022)
Victor Vescovo — Blue Origin NS-21 (2022)
Jaison Robinson — Blue Origin NS-21 (2022)
 Katya Echazarreta — Blue Origin NS-21 (2022)
 Coby Cotton — Blue Origin NS-22 (2022)
 Clint Kelly III — Blue Origin NS-22 (2022)
 Steve Young — Blue Origin NS-22 (2022)
 Robert Michael White — X-15 Flight 62 (1962)
 Joseph A. Walker — X-15 Flight 77 (1963); also flew above 100 km
 Robert A. Rushworth — X-15 Flight 87 (1963)
 Michael J. Adams — X-15 Flight 3-65-97 (1963)
 Joe Engle — X-15 Flights 138 (1965), 143 (1965), and 153 (1965); also orbited
 John B. McKay — X-15 Flight 150 (1965)
 William H. Dana — X-15 Flights 174 (1966) and 197 (1968)
 William J. Knight — X-15 Flight 190 (1967)
 Mark P. Stucky — VSS Unity VP-03 (2018)
 Frederick W. Sturckow — VSS Unity VP-03 (2018), VSS Unity 21 (2021); also orbited
 Michael Masucci — VSS Unity VF-01 (2019), Virgin Galactic Unity 22 (2021)
 Beth Moses — VSS Unity VF-01 (2019), Virgin Galactic Unity 22 (2021)
 Sirisha Bandla — Virgin Galactic Unity 22 (2021)

The Netherlands
The following person flew or was launched into the upper atmosphere, above , which counts as a space flight by Fédération Aéronautique Internationale guidelines:
 Oliver Daemen — Blue Origin NS-16 (2021)

United Kingdom
The following persons flew or was launched into the upper atmosphere, above , which counts as a space flight by Fédération Aéronautique Internationale guidelines:

Hamish Harding — Blue Origin NS-21 (2022)
Vanessa O'Brien — Blue Origin NS-22 (2022)
 David Mackay — VSS Unity VF-01 (2019), VSS Unity 21  (2021), Virgin Galactic Unity 22 (2021)
 Richard Branson — Virgin Galactic Unity 22 (2021)
 Colin Bennett — Virgin Galactic Unity 22 (2021)

Additionally, Hamish Harding is a dual national British and UAE and Vanessa O'Brien is a dual national American and British. Both chose to fly the British flag on their respective Blue Origin flights.

Orbital space travelers

Afghanistan
 Abdul Ahad Mohmand (Intercosmos), first Afghan in space — Soyuz TM-6/5 (1988)

Australia
 Andy Thomas - STS-77 (1996)
 Paul Desmond Scully-Power, first Australian in space -STS-41-G (1984)

Brazil
 Marcos Pontes, first Brazilian in space, first lusophone in space, first professional astronaut officially representing a Southern Hemisphere country in space. — Soyuz TMA-8/Missão Centenário (2006)

Bulgaria
 Georgi Ivanov (Intercosmos), first Bulgarian in space. — Soyuz 33 (1979)
 Aleksandar Panayotov Aleksandrov (Intercosmos) — Soyuz TM-5/4 (1988)

Canada
 Marc Garneau, first Canadian in space — STS-41-G (1984), STS-77 (1996), STS-97 (2000)
 Roberta Bondar, first Canadian woman in space — STS-42 (1992)
 Steven MacLean — STS-52 (1992), STS-115 (2006)
 Chris Hadfield, first Canadian to walk in space — STS-74 (1995), STS-100 (2001), Soyuz TMA-07M (2012)
 Robert Thirsk — STS-78 (1996), Soyuz TMA-15 (2009)
 Bjarni Tryggvason, born in Iceland — STS-85 (1997)
 Julie Payette — STS-96 (1999), STS-127 (2009)
 Dafydd Williams — STS-90 (1998), STS-118 (2007)
 Guy Laliberté, space tourist — Soyuz TMA-16/14 (2009)
 David Saint-Jacques – Soyuz MS-11 (2018)
 Mark Pathy, Axiom Mission 1 (2022)

China

 Yang Liwei, first Chinese national in space — Shenzhou 5 (2003)
 Fei Junlong — Shenzhou 6 (2005), Shenzhou 15 (2022)
 Nie Haisheng — Shenzhou 6 (2005), Shenzhou 10 (2013), Shenzhou 12 (2021)
 Zhai Zhigang, first Chinese national to walk in space — Shenzhou 7 (2008), Shenzhou 13 (2021)
 Liu Boming — Shenzhou 7 (2008), Shenzhou 12 (2021)
 Jing Haipeng — Shenzhou 7 (2008), Shenzhou 9 (2012), Shenzhou 11 (2016)
 Liu Wang — Shenzhou 9 (2012)
 Liu Yang, first Chinese woman in space — Shenzhou 9 (2012), Shenzhou 14 (2022)
 Wang Yaping — Shenzhou 10 (2013), Shenzhou 13 (2021)
 Zhang Xiaoguan — Shenzhou 10 (2013)
 Chen Dong — Shenzhou 11 (2016), Shenzhou 14 (2022)
 Tang Hongbo — Shenzhou 12 (2021)
 Ye Guangfu — Shenzhou 13 (2021)
 Cai Xuzhe — Shenzhou 14 (2022)
 Deng Qingming — Shenzhou 15 (2022)
 Zhang Lu — Shenzhou 15 (2022)

Cuba
 Arnaldo Tamayo Méndez (Intercosmos), the first Cuban and the first person from a country in the Western Hemisphere other than the U.S. to travel to space. He was also the first Hispanophone and first person of African ancestry in space. — Soyuz 38 (1980)

Czechoslovakia
 Vladimír Remek (Intercosmos), first Czechoslovak and first non-Soviet European in space. — Soyuz 28 (1978)

European Space Agency members

Some of these astronauts participated in national space programme activity unrelated to their home country's contemporary or subsequent membership of the European Space Agency.

Austria
 Franz Viehböck, first Austrian in space. — Soyuz TM-13/12 (1991)

Belgium
 Dirk Frimout, first Belgian in space. — STS-45 (1992)
 Frank De Winne, EAC — Soyuz TMA-1/TM-34 (2002), Soyuz TMA-15 (2009)

Denmark
 Andreas Mogensen, EAC, first Dane in space. — Soyuz TMA-18M (2015)/16M (2015)

France
 Jean-Loup Chrétien, CNES (Intercosmos), first French person in space and first non-Soviet European to walk in space — Soyuz T-6 (1982), Soyuz TM-7/6 (1988), STS-86 (1997)
 Patrick Baudry, second Frenchman in space, born in Douala, Cameroon — STS-51-G (1985)
 Michel Tognini, EAC — Soyuz TM-15/14 (1992), STS-93 (1999)
 Jean-Pierre Haigneré, EAC — Soyuz TM-17/16 (1993), Soyuz TM-29 (1999)
 Jean-François Clervoy, EAC — STS-66 (1994), STS-84 (1997), STS-103 (1999)
 Jean-Jacques Favier, born in Kehl, Germany — STS-78 (1996)
 Claudie André-Deshays Haigneré, EAC, first Frenchwoman in space (Mir, 1996) — Soyuz TM-24/23 (1996), Soyuz TM-33/32 (2001)
 Léopold Eyharts, EAC — Soyuz TM-27/26 (1998), STS-122/123 (2008)
 Philippe Perrin, EAC, born in Meknes, Morocco — STS-111 (2002)
 Thomas Pesquet, EAC — Soyuz MS-03 (2016), SpaceX Crew-2 (2021)

Germany

 Sigmund Jähn (Intercosmos), first German in space — Soyuz 31/29 (1978) (flew for East Germany)
 Ulf Merbold, EAC — STS-9 (1983), STS-42 (1992), Soyuz TM-20/19 (1994) (flew for both West Germany and united Germany)
 Ernst Messerschmid — STS-61-A (1985) (flew for West Germany)
 Reinhard Furrer, born in Wörgl, Austria (1940–1995) — STS-61-A (1985) (flew for West Germany)
 Klaus-Dietrich Flade — Soyuz TM-14/13 (1992)
 Ulrich Walter — STS-55 (1993)
 Hans Schlegel, EAC — STS-55 (1993), STS-122 (2008)
 Reinhold Ewald, EAC — Soyuz TM-25/24 (1997)
 Gerhard Thiele, EAC — STS-99 (2000)
 Thomas Reiter, EAC, first German to walk in space and first ESA astronaut to stay on the ISS. — Soyuz TM-22 (1995), STS-121/116 (2006)
 Alexander Gerst, EAC — Soyuz TMA-13M (2014), Soyuz MS-09 (2018)
 Matthias Maurer, EAC — SpaceX Crew-3 (2021)

Italy
 Franco Malerba, first Italian in space. — STS-46 (1992)
 Maurizio Cheli, EAC — STS-75 (1996)
 Umberto Guidoni, EAC — STS-75 (1996), STS-100 (2001)
 Roberto Vittori, EAC — Soyuz TM-34/33 (2002), Soyuz TMA-6/5 (2005), STS-134 (2011)
 Paolo A. Nespoli, EAC — STS-120 (2007), Soyuz TMA-20 (2010), Soyuz MS-05 (2017)
 Luca Parmitano, EAC, first Italian to walk in space. — Soyuz TMA-09M (2013), Soyuz MS-13 (2019)
 Samantha Cristoforetti, EAC, first Italian woman in space — Soyuz TMA-15M (2014), SpaceX Crew-4 (2022)

Netherlands

 Wubbo Ockels, EAC, first Dutchman in space. — STS-61-A (1985)
 André Kuipers, EAC — Soyuz TMA-4/3 (2004), Soyuz TMA-03M (2011)

Poland
 Mirosław Hermaszewski (Intercosmos), first Pole in space. — Soyuz 30 (1978)

Romania
 Dumitru Prunariu (Intercosmos), first Romanian in space. — Soyuz 40 (1981)

Spain
 Pedro Duque, EAC, first Spaniard in space. — STS-95 (1998), Soyuz TMA-3/2 (2003)

Sweden
 Christer Fuglesang, EAC, first Swede in space. — STS-116 (2006), STS-128 (2009)

Switzerland
 Claude Nicollier, EAC, first Swiss in space. — STS-46 (1992), STS-61 (1993), STS-75 (1996), STS-103 (1999)

United Kingdom
 Helen Sharman, Project Juno, first Briton in space. — Soyuz TM-12/11 (1991)
 Tim Peake, EAC, first professional British astronaut in space. — Soyuz TMA-19M (2015)

Additionally, Michael Foale was born in England to a British father and American mother. He is a dual citizen of the United Kingdom and the United States, and was raised and educated in England. He flew as a member of NASA's Astronaut Corps with dual British American citizenship. Gregory H. Johnson has foreign (US) citizenship, having been born in the UK to American parents, while Piers Sellers, Nicholas Patrick, Richard Garriott and Mark Shuttleworth have dual nationalities.

Hungary
 Bertalan Farkas (Intercosmos), first Hungarian in space. — Soyuz 36/35 (1980)

India 
 Rakesh Sharma (cosmonaut), first Indian national in space. — Soyuz T-11/10 (1984)
 Kalpana Chawla , first Indian woman national in space. — Space Shuttle Columbia (1997)

Israel
 Ilan Ramon (1954–2003), first Israeli in space, died on the Columbia. — STS-107 (2003)
 Eytan Stibbe, Axiom Mission 1 (2022)

Japan

 Toyohiro Akiyama, first Japanese person in space, the first journalist in space, and the first civilian on a commercial space flight. — Soyuz TM-11/10 (1990)
 Chiaki Mukai, first Japanese woman in space. — STS-65 (1994), STS-95 (1998)
 Koichi Wakata — STS-72 (1996), STS-92 (2000), STS-119/127 (2009), Soyuz TMA-11M (2013), SpaceX Crew-5 (2022)
 Takao Doi, first Japanese man to walk in space. — STS-87 (1997), STS-123 (2008)
 Mamoru Mohri — STS-47 (1992), STS-99 (2000)
 Soichi Noguchi — STS-114 (2005), Soyuz TMA-17 (2009), SpaceX Crew-1 (2020)
 Akihiko Hoshide — STS-124 (2008), Soyuz TMA-05M (2012), SpaceX Crew-2 (2021)
 Naoko Yamazaki — STS-131 (2010)
 Satoshi Furukawa — Soyuz TMA-01M (2011)
 Kimiya Yui — Soyuz TMA-17M (2015)
 Takuya Onishi — Soyuz MS-01 (2016)
 Norishige Kanai — Soyuz MS-07 (2017)
Yusaku Maezawa  — Soyuz MS-20 (2021)
Yozo Hirano  — Soyuz MS-20 (2021)

Kazakhstan
 Aidyn Aimbetov — Soyuz TMA-18M/16M (2015)
 Note: Kazakh cosmonauts Toktar Aubakirov and Talgat Musabayev flew under the Soviet and Russian flags.

Malaysia
 Sheikh Muszaphar Shukor, first Malaysian in space — Soyuz TMA-11/10 (2007)

Mexico
 Rodolfo Neri Vela, first Mexican in space. — STS-61-B (1985)

Mongolia
 Jügderdemidiin Gürragchaa (Intercosmos), first Mongolian in space. — Soyuz 39 (1981)

Poland 

 Mirosław Hermaszewski, first Pole in space. — Soyuz 30 (1978)

Russia and the Soviet Union 

The Soviet space program came under the control of the Russian Federation in December 1991; the new program, now called the Russian Federal Space Agency, retained continuity of equipment and personnel with the Soviet program. While all Soviet and RKA cosmonauts were born within the borders of the U.S.S.R., many were born outside the boundaries of Russia, and may be claimed by other Soviet successor states as nationals of those states. These cosmonauts are marked with an asterisk * and their place of birth is shown in an appended list. All, however, claimed Soviet or Russian citizenship at the time of their space flights.

A
 Viktor Mikhaylovich Afanasyev —  Soyuz TM-11 (1990),  Soyuz TM-18 (1994), Soyuz TM-29 (1999), Soyuz TM-33/32 (2001)
 Vladimir Aksyonov —  Soyuz 22 (1976), Soyuz T-2 (1980)
 Aleksandr Pavlovich Aleksandrov —  Soyuz T-9 (1983), Soyuz TM-3 (1987)
Oleg Artemyev* —  Soyuz TMA-12M, Soyuz MS-08, Soyuz MS-21
 Anatoly Artsebarsky* —  Soyuz TM-12 (1991)
 Yuri Artyukhin (1930–1998) —  Soyuz 14 (1974)
 Oleg Atkov —  Soyuz T-10/11 (1984)
 Toktar Aubakirov* —  Soyuz TM-13/12 (1991)
 Sergei Avdeyev —  Soyuz TM-15 (1992), Soyuz TM-22 (1995)

B
 Aleksandr Balandin —  Soyuz TM-9 (1990)
 Yuri Baturin, first Russian politician in space. —  Soyuz TM-28/27 (1998), Soyuz TM-32/31 (2001)
 Pavel Belyayev (1925–1970) —  Voskhod 2 (1965)
 Georgi Beregovoi* (1921–1995) —  Soyuz 3 (1968)
 Anatoly Berezovoy (1942–2014) —  Soyuz T-5/7 (1982)
 Andrei Borisenko —  Soyuz TMA-21 (2011), Soyuz MS-02 (2016)
 Nikolai Budarin —  STS-71/Soyuz TM-21 (1995), Soyuz TM-27 (1998), STS-113/Soyuz TMA-1 (2002)
 Valery Bykovsky —  Vostok 5 (1963), Soyuz 22 (1976), Soyuz 31/29 (1978)

D
 Vladimir N. Dezhurov —  Soyuz TM-21/STS-71 (1995)
 Georgi Dobrovolski* (1928–1971), died on reentry. —  Soyuz 11 (1971)
 Pyotr Dubrov —  Soyuz MS-18/Soyuz MS-19 (2021–22)
 Lev Dyomin (1926–1998) —  Soyuz 15 (1974)
 Vladimir Dzhanibekov* —  Soyuz 27/26 (1978), Soyuz 39 (1981), Soyuz T-6 (1982), Soyuz T-12 (1984), Soyuz T-13 (1985)

F
 Andrey Fedyaev —  SpaceX Crew-6 (2023)
 Konstantin Feoktistov (1926–2009) —  Voskhod 1 (1964)
 Anatoly Filipchenko —  Soyuz 7 (1969), Soyuz 16 (1974)

G
 Yuri Gagarin (1934–1968), first person in space. —  Vostok 1 (1961)
 Yuri Gidzenko* —  Soyuz TM-22 (1995), Soyuz TM-31/STS-102 (2001), Soyuz TM-34/Soyuz TM-33 (2002)
 Yuri Glazkov (1939–2008) —  Soyuz 24 (1977)
 Viktor Gorbatko —  Soyuz 7 (1969), Soyuz 24 (1977), Soyuz 37/36 (1980)
 Georgi Grechko —  Soyuz 17 (1975), Soyuz 26/27 (1977), Soyuz T-14/13 (1985)
 Aleksei Gubarev —  Soyuz 17 (1975), Soyuz 28 (1978)

I
 Aleksandr Ivanchenkov —  Soyuz 29/31 (1978)
 Anatoli Ivanishin —  Soyuz TMA-22 (2011), Soyuz MS-01 (2016)

K
 Aleksandr Kaleri* —  Soyuz TM-14 (1992), Soyuz TM-24 (1996), Soyuz TM-30 (2000), Soyuz TMA-3 (2003), Soyuz TMA-01M (2010)
 Yevgeny Khrunov (1933–2000) —  Soyuz 5/4 (1969)
 Anna Kikina — SpaceX Crew-5 (2022)
 Leonid Kizim* (1941–2010) —  Soyuz T-3 (1980), Soyuz T-10/11 (1984), Soyuz T-15 (1986)
 Pyotr Klimuk* —  Soyuz 13 (1973), Soyuz 18 (1975), Soyuz 30 (1978)
 Vladimir Komarov (1927–1967), died during reentry of first Soyuz spacecraft. —  Voskhod 1 (1964), Soyuz 1 (1967)
 Yelena V. Kondakova —  Soyuz TM-20 (1994), STS-84 (1997)
 Dmitri Kondratyev —  Soyuz TMA-20 (2010)
 Oleg Kononenko* —  Soyuz TMA-12 (2008), Soyuz TMA-03M (2011), Soyuz TMA-17M (2015)
 Mikhail Korniyenko —  Soyuz TMA-18 (2010), Soyuz TMA-16M (2015)
Sergey Korsakov* —  Soyuz MS-21 (2022)
 Valery Korzun —  Soyuz TM-24 (1996), STS-111/113 (2002)
 Oleg Kotov* —  Soyuz TMA-10 (2007), Soyuz TMA-17 (2009), Soyuz TMA-10M (2013)
 Vladimir Kovalyonok* —  Soyuz 25 (1977), Soyuz 29/31 (1978), Soyuz T-4 (1981)
 Konstantin Kozeyev —  Soyuz TM-33/32 (2001)
 Sergei Krikalev, six space flights and, as of 2006, holds record for longest total time in space: 803 days, 9 hours and 39 minutes. —  Soyuz TM-7 (1988), Soyuz TM-12/13 (1991),  STS-60 (1994), STS-88 (1998), Soyuz TM-31/STS-102 (2000), Soyuz TMA-6 (2005)
 Sergey Kud-Sverchkov —  Soyuz MS-16 (2020)
 Valeri Kubasov —  Soyuz 6 (1969), Soyuz 19 (1975), Soyuz 36/35 (1980)

L
 Aleksandr Laveykin —  Soyuz TM-2 (1987)
 Vasili Lazarev (1928–1990) —  Soyuz 12 (1973), Soyuz 18a (1975)
 Aleksandr Lazutkin —  Soyuz TM-25 (1997) 
 Valentin Lebedev —  Soyuz 13 (1973), Soyuz T-5/7 (1982)
 Alexsei Leonov, first person to "walk in space" (to make an EVA). —  Voskhod 2 (1965), Soyuz 19 (1975)
 Anatoli Levchenko* (1941–1988) —  Soyuz TM-4/3 (1987)
 Yuri Lonchakov* —  STS-100 (2001), Soyuz TMA-1/TM-34 (2002), Soyuz TMA-13 (2008)
 Vladimir Lyakhov* —  Soyuz 32/34 (1979), Soyuz T-9 (1983), Soyuz TM-6/5 (1988)

M
 Oleg Makarov (1933–2003) —  Soyuz 12 (1973), Soyuz 18a (1975), Soyuz 27/26 (1978), Soyuz T-3 (1980)
 Yuri Malenchenko* —  Soyuz TM-19 (1994), STS-106 (2000), Soyuz TMA-1 (2003), Soyuz TMA-11 (2007), Soyuz TMA-05M (2012), Soyuz TMA-19M (2015)
 Yury Malyshev (1941–1999) —  Soyuz T-2 (1980), Soyuz T-11/10 (1984)
 Gennadi Manakov —  Soyuz TM-10 (1990),  Soyuz TM-16 (1993)
 Musa Manarov* —  Soyuz TM-4/6 (1987), Soyuz TM-11 (1990)
Denis Matveev —  Soyuz MS-21 (2022)
 Alexander Misurkin —  Soyuz TMA-08M (2013), Soyuz MS-06 (2017), Soyuz MS-20 (2021)
 Boris Morukov (1950–2015) —  STS-106 (2000)
 Talgat Musabayev* —  Soyuz TM-19 (1994), Soyuz TM-27 (1998), Soyuz TM-32/31 (2001)

N
 Andriyan Nikolayev (1929–2004), first astronaut of Chuvash descent —  Vostok 3 (1962), Soyuz 9 (1970)
 Oleg Novitski* —  Soyuz TMA-06M (2012), Soyuz MS-03 (2016), Soyuz MS-18 (2021)

O
 Yuri Onufrienko* —  Soyuz TM-23 (1996), STS-108/111 (2001)
 Aleksei Ovchinin —  Soyuz TMA-20M (2016)

P
 Gennady Padalka —  Soyuz TM-28 (1998), Soyuz TMA-4 (2004), Soyuz TMA-14 (2009), Soyuz TMA-04M (2012), Soyuz TMA-16M (2015)
 Viktor Patsayev* (1933–1971), died in reentry. —  Soyuz 11 (1971)
 Yulia Peresild —  Soyuz MS-19  (2021)
 Dmitry Petelin — Soyuz MS-22 (2022)
 Aleksandr Poleshchuk —  Soyuz TM-16 (1993)
 Valeri Polyakov, holds record for single longest spaceflight, 437 days —  Soyuz TM-6/7 (1988),  Soyuz TM-18/20 (1994)
 Leonid Popov* —  Soyuz 35/37 (1980), Soyuz 40 (1981), Soyuz T-7/5 (1982)
 Pavel Popovich* (1930–2009) —  Vostok 4 (1962), Soyuz 14 (1974)
 Sergey Prokopyev —  Soyuz MS-09 (2018), Soyuz MS-22 (2022)

R
 Sergei Revin —  Soyuz TMA-04M (2012)
 Roman Romanenko —  Soyuz TMA-15 (2009), Soyuz TMA-07M (2012)
 Yuri Romanenko —  Soyuz 26/27 (1977), Soyuz 38 (1980), Soyuz TM-2/3 (1987)
 Valery Rozhdestvensky —  Soyuz 23 (1976)
 Nikolai Rukavishnikov (1932–2002) —  Soyuz 10 (1971), Soyuz 16 (1974), Soyuz 33 (1979)
 Sergei Ryazanski —  Soyuz TMA-10M (2013), Soyuz MS-05 (2017)
 Valery Ryumin —  Soyuz 25 (1977), Soyuz 32/34 (1979), Soyuz 35/37 (1980),  STS-91 (1998)
 Sergei Ryzhikov —  Soyuz MS-02 (2016), Soyuz MS-16 (2020)

S
 Aleksandr Samokutyayev —  Soyuz TMA-21 (2011), Soyuz TMA-14M (2014)
 Gennadi Sarafanov (1942–2005) —  Soyuz 15 (1974)
 Viktor Savinykh —  Soyuz T-4 (1981), Soyuz T-13/14 (1985)
 Svetlana Savitskaya, first woman to walk in space. —  Soyuz T-7/5 (1982), Soyuz T-12 (1984)
 Aleksandr Serebrov (1944–2013) —  Soyuz T-7/5 (1982), Soyuz T-8 (1983), Soyuz TM-8 (1989),  Soyuz TM-17 (1993)
 Yelena Serova —  Soyuz TMA-14M (2014)
 Vitali Sevastyanov (1935–2010) —  Soyuz 9 (1970), Soyuz 18 (1975)
 Yuri Shargin, first Russian military cosmonaut —  Soyuz TMA-5/4 (2004)
 Salizhan Sharipov* —  STS-89 (1998), Soyuz TMA-5 (2004)
 Vladimir Shatalov* —  Soyuz 4 (1969), Soyuz 8 (1969), Soyuz 10 (1971)
 Klim Shipenko —  Soyuz MS-19  (2021)
 Anton Shkaplerov —  Soyuz TMA-22 (2011), Soyuz TMA-15M (2014) & Soyuz MS-19 (2021)
 Georgi Shonin* (1935–1997) —  Soyuz 6 (1969)
 Oleg Skripochka —  Soyuz TMA-01M (2010), Soyuz TMA-20M (2016)
 Aleksandr Skvortsov —  Soyuz TMA-18 (2010)
 Anatoly Solovyev* —  Soyuz TM-5/4 (1988), Soyuz TM-9 (1990),  Soyuz TM-15 (1992), STS-71/Soyuz TM-21 (1995), Soyuz TM-26 (1997) 
 Vladimir Solovyov —  Soyuz T-10/11 (1984), Soyuz T-15 (1986)
 Gennadi Strekalov (1940–2004) —  Soyuz T-3 (1980), Soyuz T-8 (1983), Soyuz T-11/10 (1984), Soyuz TM-10 (1990),  Soyuz TM-21/STS-71 (1995)
 Maksim Surayev —  Soyuz TMA-16 (2009), Soyuz TMA-13M (2014)

T
 Yevgeni Tarelkin —  Soyuz TMA-06M (2012)
 Valentina Tereshkova, first woman in space. —  Vostok 6 (1963)
 Gherman Titov (1935–2000), the second person to make a space flight and the first to stay up for a day. —  Vostok 2 (1961)
 Vladimir Titov —  Soyuz T-8 (1983), Soyuz TM-4/6 (1987),  STS-63 (1995), STS-86 (1997)
 Valeri Tokarev —  STS-96 (1999), Soyuz TMA-7 (2005)
 Sergei Treshchov —  STS-111/113 (2002)
 Vasili Tsibliyev* —  Soyuz TM-17 (1993), Soyuz TM-25 (1997)
 Mikhail Tyurin —  STS-105/108 (2001), Soyuz TMA-9 (2006), Soyuz TMA-11M (2013)

U
 Yuri Usachov —  Soyuz TM-18 (1994), Soyuz TM-23 (1996), STS-101 (2000), STS-102/STS-105 (2001)

V
 Vladimir Vasyutin* (1952–2002) —  Soyuz T-14 (1985)
 Ivan Vagner  Soyuz MS-16 (2020)
 Aleksandr Viktorenko* —  Soyuz TM-3/2 (1987), Soyuz TM-8 (1989),  Soyuz TM-14 (1992), Soyuz TM-20 (1994)
 Pavel Vinogradov —  Soyuz TM-26 (1997), Soyuz TMA-8 (2006), Soyuz TMA-08M (2013)
 Igor Volk* (1937–2017) —  Soyuz T-12 (1984)
 Alexander Volkov* —  Soyuz T-14 (1985), Soyuz TM-7 (1988), / Soyuz TM-13 (1991)
 Sergey Aleksandrovich Volkov* —  Soyuz TMA-12 (2008), Soyuz TMA-01M (2011), Soyuz TMA-18M (2015)
 Vladislav Volkov (1935–1971), died on reentry. —  Soyuz 7 (1969), Soyuz 11 (1971)
 Boris Volynov —  Soyuz 5 (1969), Soyuz 21 (1976)

Y
 Boris Yegorov (1937–1994) —  Voskhod 1 (1964)
 Aleksei Yeliseyev —  Soyuz 5/4 (1969), Soyuz 8 (1969), Soyuz 10 (1971)
 Fyodor Yurchikhin* —  STS-112 (2002), Soyuz TMA-10 (2007), Soyuz TMA-19 (2010), Soyuz TMA-09M (2013), Soyuz MS-04 (2017)

Z
 Sergei Zalyotin —  Soyuz TM-30 (2000), Soyuz TMA-1/TM-34 (2002)
 Vitali Zholobov* —  Soyuz 21 (1976)
 Vyacheslav Zudov —  Soyuz 23 (1976)

Soviet and Russian cosmonauts born outside Russia
All of the locations below were part of the former U.S.S.R. at the time of the cosmonauts' birth.

Azerbaidzhan S.S.R. / Azerbaijan  

 Musa Manarov, born in Baku, Azerbaijan

Byelorussian S.S.R. / Belarus 

 Pyotr Klimuk, born in Komarovka, Belarus 
 Vladimir Kovalyonok, born in Beloye, Belarus 
 Oleg Novitski, born in Chervyen', Belarus

Georgian S.S.R. / Georgia  

 Fyodor Yurchikhin, born in Batumi, Georgia

Kazakh S.S.R. / Kazakhstan  

 Toktar Aubakirov, born in Karaganda, Kazakhstan 
 Yuri Lonchakov, born in Balkhash, Kazakhstan 
 Talgat Musabayev, born in Kargaly, Kazakhstan 
 Viktor Patsayev, born in Aktyubinsk, Kazakhstan 
Dmitry Petelin — born in Kustanai, Kazakhstan  
 Vladimir Shatalov, born in Petropavlovsk, Kazakhstan 
 Aleksandr Viktorenko, born in Olginka, Kazakhstan

Kirghiz S.S.R. / Kyrgyzstan  

 Salizhan Sharipov, born in Uzgen, Kyrgyzstan 
Sergey Korsakov, born in Krunze, Kyrgyzstan

Latvian S.S.R. / Latvia 

 Aleksandr Kaleri, born in Jūrmala, Latvia 
 Anatoly Solovyev, born in Riga, Latvia  
 Oleg Artemyev, born in Riga, Latvia

Turkmen S.S.R. / Turkmenistan 

 Oleg Kononenko, born in Chardzhou, Turkmenistan

Ukrainian S.S.R. / Ukraine 

 Anatoly Artsebarsky, born in Prosyana, Ukraine 
 Georgi Beregovoi, born in Federivka, Ukraine 
 Georgiy Dobrovolskiy, born in Odessa, Ukraine 
 Yuri Gidzenko, born in Yelanets, Ukraine 
 Leonid Kizim, born in Krasnyi Lyman, Ukraine 
 Oleg Kotov, born in Simferopol, Ukraine 
 Anatoli Levchenko, born in Krasnokutsk, Ukraine 
 Vladimir Lyakhov, born in Antratsyt, Ukraine 
 Yuri Malenchenko, born in Svitlovodsk, Ukraine 
 Yuri Onufriyenko, born in Ryasne, Ukraine 
 Leonid Popov, born in Oleksandriia, Ukraine 
 Pavel Popovich, born in Uzyn, Ukraine. 
 Georgi Shonin, born in Rovenky, Ukraine 
 Vasili Tsibliyev, born in Horikhivka, Ukraine 
 Vladimir Vasyutin, born in Kharkiv, Ukraine 
 Igor Volk, born in Zmiiv, Ukraine 
 Aleksandr Volkov, born in Horlivka, Ukraine  
 Sergei Aleksandrovich Volkov, born in Chuhuiv, Ukraine 
 Vitali Zholobov, born in Zburyivka, Ukraine

Uzbek S.S.R. / Uzbekistan 

 Vladimir Dzhanibekov, born in Iskandar, Uzbekistan

Saudi Arabia
 Sultan Salman Al Saud, first Saudi in space. — STS-51-G (1985)

Slovakia
 Ivan Bella, first Slovak in space. — Soyuz TM-29/28 (1999)

South Africa
 Mark Shuttleworth, second "space tourist" and first South African in space. — Soyuz TM-34/33 (2002)

South Korea
 Yi So-yeon, Spaceflight participant, first South Korean in space — Soyuz TMA-12/11 (2008)

Syria
 Muhammed Faris (Intercosmos), first Syrian in space. — Soyuz TM-3/2 (1987)

Ukraine
 Leonid Kadeniuk, first Ukrainian in space since independence. — STS-87 (1997)
 Note: Ukrainian cosmonauts Anatoly Artsebarsky, Georgi Beregovoi, Georgiy Dobrovolskiy, Leonid Kizim, Anatoli Levchenko, Vladimir Lyakhov, Leonid Popov, Pavel Popovich, Georgi Shonin, Vladimir Vasyutin, Igor Volk and Vitali Zholobov flew under the Soviet flag; Ukrainian astronaut born in the United States Heidemarie Stefanyshyn-Piper flew under the American flag

United Arab Emirates
 Hazza Al Mansouri, first Emirati in space. - Soyuz MS-15/MS-12 (2019)
 Sultan Al Neyadi, first long duration Emirati in space. - SpaceX Crew-6 (2023)

United States
  Asterisked space travelers were born outside the United States

A 
 Joseph M. Acaba — STS-119 (2009), Soyuz TMA-04M (2012)
 Loren Acton — STS-51-F (1985)
 James C. Adamson — STS-28 (1989), STS-43 (1991)
 Thomas Akers — STS-41 (1990), STS-49 (1992), STS-61 (1993), STS-79 (1996)
 Buzz Aldrin, the second person to walk on the Moon — Gemini 12 (1966), Apollo 11 (1969)
 Andrew M. Allen — STS-46 (1992), STS-62 (1994), STS-75 (1996)
 Joseph P. Allen — STS-5 (1982), STS-51-A (1984)
 Scott Altman — STS-90 (1998), STS-106 (2000), STS-109 (2002), STS-125 (2009)
 William Anders* — Apollo 8 (1968)
 Clayton Anderson — STS-117/120 (2007), STS-131 (2010)
 Michael P. Anderson (1959–2003), died on the Columbia — STS-89 (1998), STS-107 (2003)
 Anousheh Ansari*, fourth space tourist and first female space tourist — Soyuz TMA-9/8 (2006)
 Dominic A. Antonelli — STS-119 (2009), STS-132 (2010)
 Jerome Apt — STS-37 (1991), STS-47 (1992), STS-59 (1994), STS-79 (1996)
 Hayley Arceneaux - Inspiration4 (2021)
 Lee Archambault — STS-117 (2007), STS-119 (2009)
 Neil Armstrong (1930–2012), first person to walk on the Moon — Gemini 8 (1966), Apollo 11 (1969)
 Richard R. Arnold — STS-119 (2009), Soyuz MS-08 (2018)
 Jeffrey Ashby — STS-93 (1999), STS-100 (2001), STS-112 (2002)
 Serena Auñón-Chancellor - Soyuz MS-09 (2018)

B 
 James P. Bagian, first person of Armenian descent to have been in space — STS-29 (1989), STS-40 (1991)
 Ellen S. Baker — STS-34 (1989), STS-50 (1992), STS-71 (1995)
 Michael A. Baker — STS-43 (1991), STS-52 (1992), STS-68 (1994), STS-81 (1997)
 Michael R. Barratt — Soyuz TMA-14 (2009), STS-133 (2011)
 Kayla Barron — SpaceX Crew-3 (2021)
 Daniel T. Barry — STS-72 (1996), STS-96 (1999), STS-105 (2001)
 John-David F. Bartoe — STS-51-F (1985)
 Alan Bean — Apollo 12 (1969), Skylab 3 (1973)
 Robert L. Behnken — STS-123 (2008), STS-130 (2010), Crew Dragon Demo-2 (2020)
 John E. Blaha — STS-29 (1989), STS-33 (1989), STS-43 (1991), STS-58 (1993), STS-79 /81 (1996)
 Michael J. Bloomfield — STS-86, STS-97 (2000), STS-110 (2002)
 Guion Bluford, first African-American in space — STS-8 (1983), STS-61-A (1985), STS-39 (1991), STS-53 (1992)
 Karol J. Bobko, first graduate of the United States Air Force Academy to become an astronaut — STS-6 (1983), STS-51-D (1985), STS-51-J (1985)
 Eric A. Boe — STS-126 (2008), STS-133 (2011)
 Charles Bolden — STS-61-C (1985), STS-31 (1990), STS-45 (1992), STS-60 (1994)
 Frank Borman, commanded the first spaceflight to orbit the Moon — Gemini 7 (1965), Apollo 8 (1968)
 Stephen G. Bowen — STS-126 (2008), STS-132 (2010), STS-133 (2011), SpaceX Crew-6 (2023)
 Ken Bowersox — STS-50 (1992), STS-61 (1993), STS-73 (1995), STS-82 (1997), STS-113/Soyuz TMA-1 (2002)
 Charles E. Brady, Jr. (1951–2006) — STS-78 (1996)
 Vance D. Brand — Apollo-Soyuz Test Project, STS-5 (1982), STS-41-B (1984), STS-35 (1990)
 Daniel Brandenstein — STS-8 (1983), STS-51-G (1985), STS-32 (1990), STS-49 (1992)
 Randolph Bresnik — STS-129 (2009), Soyuz MS-05 (2017)
 Roy D. Bridges, Jr. — STS-51-F (1985)
 Curtis Brown — STS-47 (1992), STS-66 (1994), STS-77 (1996), STS-85 (1997), STS-95 (1998), STS-103 (1999)
 David McDowell Brown (1956–2003), died on the Columbia — STS-107 (2003)
 Mark N. Brown — STS-28 (1989), STS-48 (1991)
 James Buchli — STS-51-C (1985), STS-61-A (1985), STS-29 (1989), STS-48 (1991)
 Jay C. Buckey — STS-90 (1998)
 Daniel C. Burbank — STS-106 (2000), STS-115 (2006), Soyuz TMA-22 (2011)
 Daniel W. Bursch — STS-51 (1993), STS-68 (1994), STS-77 (1996), STS-108 (2001), STS-111 (2002)

C 
 Robert D. Cabana — STS-41 (1990), STS-53 (1992), STS-65 (1994), STS-88 (1998)
 Charles Camarda — STS-114 (2005)
 Kenneth D. Cameron — STS-37 (1991), STS-56 (1993), STS-74 (1995)
 Duane G. Carey — STS-109 (2002)
 Scott Carpenter (1925–2013) — Mercury 7 (1962)
 Gerald P. Carr — Skylab 4 (1973)
 Sonny Carter (1947–1991) — STS-33 (1989)
 John Casper — STS-36 (1990), STS-54 (1993), STS-62 (1994), STS-77 (1996)
 Josh A. Cassada — SpaceX Crew-5 (2022)
 Christopher Cassidy — STS-127 (2009), Soyuz MS-16 (2020)
 Robert J. Cenker — STS-61-C (1985)
 Gene Cernan (1934–2017) — Gemini 9A (1966), Apollo 10 (1969), Apollo 17 (1972)
 Gregory Chamitoff* — STS-124/126 (2008), STS-134 (2011)
 Franklin Chang-Diaz* — STS-61-C (1985), STS-34 (1989), STS-46 (1992), STS-60 (1994), STS-75 (1996), STS-91 (1998), STS-111 (2002)
 Raja Chari — SpaceX Crew-3 (2021)
 Kalpana Chawla* (1961–2003), died on the Columbia — STS-87 (1997), STS-107 (2003)
 Leroy Chiao — STS-65 (1994), STS-72 (1996), STS-92 (2000), Soyuz TMA-5 (2004)
 Kevin P. Chilton — STS-49 (1992), STS-59 (1994), STS-76 (1996)
 Laurel Clark (1961–2003), died on the Columbia — STS-107 (2003)
 Mary L. Cleave — STS-61-B (1985), STS-30 (1989)
 Michael R. Clifford — STS-53 (1992), STS-59 (1994), STS-76 (1996)
 Michael Coats — STS-41-D (1984), STS-29 (1989), STS-39 (1991)
 Kenneth Cockrell — STS-56 (1993), STS-69 (1995), STS-80 (1996), STS-98 (2001), STS-111 (2002)
 Catherine Coleman — STS-73 (1995), STS-93 (1999), Soyuz TMA-20 (2010)
 Eileen Collins — STS-63 (1995), STS-84 (1997), STS-93 (1999), STS-114 (2005)
 Michael Collins* (1930–2021) — Gemini 10 (1966), Apollo 11 (1969)
 Larry Connor, Axiom Mission 1 (2022)
 Pete Conrad (1930–1999) — Gemini 5 (1965), Gemini 11 (1966), Apollo 12 (1969), Skylab 2 (1973)
 Gordon Cooper (1927–2004), the first American to fly in space for a day and first person to go into orbit twice — Mercury 9 (1963), Gemini 5 (1965)
 Richard O. Covey — STS-51-I (1985), STS-26 (1988), STS-38 (1990), STS-61 (1993)
 Timothy Creamer — Soyuz TMA-17 (2009)
 John Oliver Creighton — STS-51-G (1985), STS-36 (1990), STS-48 (1991)
 Robert Crippen, flew on first Space Shuttle mission — STS-1 (1981), STS-7 (1983), STS-41-C (1984), STS-41-G (1984)
 Roger K. Crouch — STS-83 (1997), STS-94 (1997)
 Frank L. Culbertson, Jr. — STS-38 (1990), STS-51 (1993), STS-105/108 (2001)
 Walter Cunningham — Apollo 7 (1968)
 Robert Curbeam — STS-85 (1997), STS-98 (2001), STS-116 (2006)
 Nancy Currie — STS-57 (1993), STS-70 (1995), STS-88 (1998), STS-109 (2002)

D 
 Jan Davis — STS-47 (1992), STS-60 (1994), STS-85 (1997)
 Lawrence J. DeLucas — STS-50 (1992)
 B. Alvin Drew — STS-118 (2007), STS-133 (2011)
 Brian Duffy — STS-45 (1992), STS-57 (1993), STS-72 (1996), STS-92 (2000)
 Charles Moss Duke, Jr. — Apollo 16 (1972)
 Bonnie J. Dunbar — STS-61-A (1985), STS-32 (1990), STS-50 (1992), STS-71 (1995), STS-89 (1998)
 Samuel T. Durrance — STS-35 (1990), STS-67 (1995)
 James Dutton — STS-131 (2010)
 Tracy Caldwell Dyson — STS-118 (2007), Soyuz TMA-18 (2010)

E 
 Joe F. Edwards, Jr. — STS-89 (1998)
 Donn F. Eisele (1930–1987) — Apollo 7 (1968)
 Anthony W. England — STS-51-F (1985)
 Joseph Henry Engle — STS-2 (1981), STS-51-I (1985)
 Ronald Evans (1933–1990) — Apollo 17 (1972)

F 
 John M. Fabian — STS-7 (1983), STS-51-G (1985)
 Christopher Ferguson — STS-115 (2006), STS-126 (2008), STS-135 (2011)
 Martin J. Fettman — STS-58 (1993)
 Andrew J. Feustel — STS-125 (2009), STS-134 (2011) & Soyuz MS-08 (2018)
 Michael Fincke — Soyuz TMA-4 (2004), Soyuz TMA-13 (2008), STS-134 (2011)
 Jack D. Fischer — Soyuz MS-04 (2017)
 Anna Lee Fisher — STS-51-A (1984)
 William Frederick Fisher — STS-51-I (1985)
 Michael Foale* — STS-45 (1992), STS-56 (1993), STS-63 (1995), STS-84/86 (1997), STS-103 (1999), Soyuz TMA-3 (2003)
 Kevin A. Ford — STS-128 (2009), Soyuz TMA-06M (2012)
 Michael Foreman — STS-123 (2008), STS-129 (2009)
 Patrick G. Forrester — STS-105 (2001), STS-117 (2007), STS-128 (2009)
 Michael E. Fossum — STS-121 (2006), STS-124 (2008), Soyuz TMA-01M (2011)
 Stephen Frick — STS-110 (2002), STS-122 (2008)
 C. Gordon Fullerton (1936–2013) — STS-3 (1982), STS-51-F (1985)

G 
 F. Drew Gaffney — STS-40 (1991)
 Ronald J. Garan, Jr. — STS-124 (2008), Soyuz TMA-21 (2011)
 Dale Gardner — STS-8 (1983), STS-51-A (1984)
 Guy Gardner — STS-27 (1988), STS-35 (1990)
 Jake Garn, U. S. Senator at time of flight, first politician in space — STS-51-D (1985)
 Owen K. Garriott — Skylab 3 (1973), STS-9 (1983)
 Richard Garriott*, space tourist — Soyuz TMA-13 /12 (2008)
 Charles D. Gemar — STS-38 (1990), STS-48 (1991), STS-62 (1994) 
 Michael L. Gernhardt — STS-69 (1995), STS-83 (1997), STS-94 (1997), STS-104 (2001)
 Edward Gibson — Skylab 4 (1973)
 Robert L. Gibson — STS-41-B (1984), STS-61-C (1985), STS-27 (1988), STS-47 (1992), STS-71 (1995)
 John Glenn (1921–2016), first American in Earth orbit and U.S. Senator — Mercury 6 (1962), STS-95 (1998)
 Victor J. Glover — SpaceX Crew-1 (2020)
 Linda M. Godwin — STS-37 (1991), STS-59 (1994), STS-76 (1996), STS-108 (2001)
 Michael T. Good — STS-125 (2009), STS-132 (2010)
 Richard F. Gordon, Jr. — Gemini 11 (1966), Apollo 12 (1969)
 Dominic L. Pudwill Gorie — STS-91 (1998), STS-99 (2000), STS-108 (2001), STS-123 (2008)
 Ronald J. Grabe — STS-51-J (1985), STS-30 (1989), STS-42 (1992), STS-57 (1993) 
 Frederick D. Gregory — STS-51-B (1985), STS-33 (1989), STS-44 (1991)
 William G. Gregory — STS-67 (1995)
 S. David Griggs (1939–1989) — STS-51-D (1985)
 Gus Grissom (1926–1967) First person to go into space twice. — Gemini 3 (1965). Also flew suborbitally in Mercury 4 (1961). Died in the Apollo 1 (1967) (1967) launchpad fire
 John M. Grunsfeld — STS-67 (1995), STS-81 (1997), STS-103 (1999), STS-109 (2002), STS-125 (2009)
 Sidney M. Gutierrez — STS-40 (1991), STS-59 (1994)

H 
 Fred Haise — Apollo 13 (1970)
 James D. Halsell — STS-65 (1994), STS-74 (1995), STS-83 (1997), STS-94 (1997), STS-101 (2000)
 Kenneth Ham — STS-124 (2008), STS-132 (2010)
 L. Blaine Hammond — STS-39 (1991), STS-64 (1994)
 Gregory J. Harbaugh — STS-39 (1991), STS-54 (1993), STS-71 (1995), STS-82 (1997)
 Bernard A. Harris, Jr., first African-American to walk in space. — STS-55 (1993), STS-63 (1995)
 Terry Hart — STS-41-C (1984)
 Henry Hartsfield — STS-4 (1982), STS-41-D (1984), STS-61-A (1985)
 Frederick Hauck — STS-7 (1983), STS-51-A (1984), STS-26 (1988)
 Steven Hawley — STS-41-D (1984), STS-61-C (1985), STS-31 (1990), STS-82 (1997), STS-93 (1999)
 Mark T. Vande Hei — Soyuz MS-06 (2017), Soyuz MS-18 (2021)
 Susan J. Helms — STS-54 (1993), STS-64 (1994), STS-78 (1996), STS-101 (2000), STS-102/105 (2001)
 Karl Gordon Henize (1926–1993) — STS-51-F (1985)
 Thomas J. Hennen — STS-44 (1991)
 Terence T. Henricks — STS-44 (1991), STS-55 (1993), STS-70 (1995), STS-78 (1996)
 José M. Hernández — STS-128 (2009)
 John Herrington, first Native American in space. — STS-113 (2002)
 Richard Hieb — STS-39 (1991), STS-49 (1992), STS-65 (1994)
 Joan Higginbotham — STS-116 (2006)
 David C. Hilmers — STS-51-J (1985), STS-26 (1988), STS-36 (1990), STS-42 (1992)
 Robert Hines —SpaceX Crew-4 (2022)
 Kathryn P. Hire — STS-90 (1998), STS-130 (2010)
 Charles O. Hobaugh — STS-104 (2001), STS-108 (2001), STS-129 (2009)
 Jeffrey A. Hoffman — STS-51-D (1985), STS-35 (1990), STS-46 (1992), STS-61 (1993), STS-75 (1996)
 Warren Hoburg — SpaceX Crew-6 (2023)
 Michael S. Hopkins — Soyuz TMA-10M (2013), SpaceX Crew-1 (2020)
 Scott J. Horowitz — STS-75 (1996), STS-82 (1997), STS-101 (2000), STS-105 (2001)
 Millie Hughes-Fulford, first female Payload Specialist — STS-40 (1991)
 Douglas G. Hurley — STS-127 (2009), STS-135 (2011), Crew Dragon Demo-2 (2020)
 Rick Husband (1957–2003), died on the Columbia — STS-96 (1999), STS-107 (2003)

I 
 James Irwin (1930–1991) — Apollo 15 (1971)
Jared Isaacman - Inspiration4 (2021)
 Marsha Ivins — STS-32 (1990), STS-46 (1992), STS-62 (1994), STS-81 (1997), STS-98 (2001)

J 
 Mae Jemison, first African-American woman in space — STS-47 (1992)
 Tamara E. Jernigan — STS-40 (1991), STS-52 (1992), STS-67 (1995), STS-80 (1996), STS-96 (1999)
 Brent W. Jett, Jr. — STS-72 (1996), STS-81 (1997), STS-97 (2000), STS-115 (2006)
 Gregory C. Johnson — STS-125 (2009)
 Gregory H. Johnson* — STS-123 (2008), STS-134 (2011)
 Thomas David Jones — STS-59 (1994), STS-68 (1994), STS-80 (1996), STS-98 (2001)

K 
 Janet L. Kavandi — STS-91 (1998), STS-99 (2000), STS-104 (2001)
 James M. Kelly — STS-102 (2001), STS-114 (2005)
 Mark E. Kelly — STS-108 (2001), STS-121 (2006), STS-124 (2008), STS-134 (2011). Twin brother of Scott J. Kelly.
 Scott J. Kelly — STS-103 (1999), STS-118 (2007), Soyuz TMA-01M (2010), Soyuz TMA-16M (2015). Twin brother of Mark Kelly.
 Joseph P. Kerwin — Skylab 2 (1973)
 R. Shane Kimbrough — STS-126 (2008), Soyuz MS-02 (2016), SpaceX Crew-2 (2021)
 Timothy L. Kopra — STS-127 /128 (2009), Soyuz TMA-19M (2015)
 Kevin R. Kregel — STS-70 (1995), STS-78 (1996), STS-87 (1997), STS-99 (2000)

L 
 Wendy B. Lawrence — STS-67 (1995), STS-86, STS-91 (1998), STS-114 (2005)
 Mark C. Lee — STS-30 (1989), STS-47 (1992), STS-64 (1994), STS-82 (1997)
 David Leestma — STS-41-G (1984), STS-28 (1989), STS-45 (1992)
 William B. Lenoir (1939–2010) — STS-5 (1982)
 Frederick W. Leslie* — STS-73 (1995)
 Byron Lichtenberg, first NASA Payload Specialist. — STS-9 (1983), STS-45 (1992)
 Don L. Lind — STS-51-B (1985)
 Kjell N. Lindgren* — Soyuz TMA-17M (2015), SpaceX Crew-4 (2022)
 Steven W. Lindsey — STS-87 (1997), STS-95 (1998), STS-104 (2001), STS-121 (2006), STS-133 (2011),  SpaceX Crew-4 (2022) 
 Jerry M. Linenger — STS-64 (1994), STS-81/84 (1997)
 Richard M. Linnehan — STS-78 (1996), STS-90, STS-109 (2002), STS-123 (2008)
 Gregory Linteris — STS-83 (1997), STS-94 (1997)
 Paul Lockhart — STS-111 (2002), STS-113 (2002)
 Michael Lopez-Alegria* — STS-73 (1995), STS-92 (2000), STS-113 (2002), Soyuz TMA-9 (2006) Axiom Mission 1 (2022)
 John M. Lounge — STS-51-I (1985), STS-26 (1988), STS-35 (1990)
 Jack R. Lousma — Skylab 3 (1973), STS-3 (1982)
 Stanley G. Love — STS-122 (2008)
 Jim Lovell — Gemini 7 (1965), Gemini 12 (1966), Apollo 8 (1968), Apollo 13 (1970)
 G. David Low (1956–2008) — STS-32 (1990), STS-43 (1991), STS-57 (1993)
 Ed Lu — STS-84 (1997), STS-106 (2000), Soyuz TMA-1 (2003)
 Shannon Lucid* — STS-51-G (1985), STS-34 (1989), STS-43 (1991), STS-58 (1993), STS-76/79 (1996)

M 
 Sandra Magnus — STS-112 (2002), STS-126 /119 (2008), STS-135 (2011)
Nicole Aunapu Mann — SpaceX Crew-5 (2022)
 Thomas Marshburn — STS-127 (2009), Soyuz TMA-07M (2012), SpaceX Crew-3 (2021)
 Michael Massimino — STS-109 (2002), STS-125 (2009)
 Richard Mastracchio — STS-106 (2000), STS-118 (2007), STS-131 (2010), Soyuz TMA-11M (2013)
 Ken Mattingly — Apollo 16 (1972), STS-4 (1982), STS-51-C (1985)
 K. Megan McArthur — STS-125 (2009), SpaceX Crew-2 (2021)
 William S. McArthur — STS-58 (1993), STS-74 (1995), STS-92 (2000), Soyuz TMA-7 (2005)
 Jon McBride — STS-41-G (1984)
 Bruce McCandless II (1937–2017) — STS-41-B (1984), STS-31 (1990)
 William C. McCool (1961–2003), died on the Columbia — STS-107 (203)
 Anne McClain — Soyuz MS-11 (2018)
 Michael J. McCulley — STS-34 (1989)
 James McDivitt — Gemini 4 (1965), Apollo 9 (1969)
 Donald R. McMonagle — STS-39 (1991), STS-54 (1993), STS-66 (1994) 
 Ronald McNair (1950–1986), died on the Challenger — STS-41-B (1984)
 Carl J. Meade — STS-38 (1990), STS-50 (1992), STS-64 (1994)
 Jessica Meir — Soyuz MS-15 (2019)
 Bruce E. Melnick — STS-41 (1990), STS-49 (1992)
 Pamela Melroy — STS-92 (2000), STS-112 (2002), STS-120 (2007)
 Leland D. Melvin — STS-122 (2008), STS-129 (2009)
 Dorothy M. Metcalf-Lindenburger — STS-131 (2010)
 Edgar Mitchell (1930–2016) — Apollo 14 (1971)
 Barbara Morgan — STS-118 (2007) 
 Lee M.E. Morin — STS-110 (2002)
 Richard Mullane — STS-41-D (1984), STS-27 (1988), STS-36 (1990)
 Story Musgrave — STS-6 (1983), STS-51-F (1985), STS-33 (1989), STS-44 (1991), STS-61 (1993), STS-80 (1996)

N 
 Steven R. Nagel — STS-51-G (1985), STS-61-A (1985), STS-37 (1991), STS-55 (1993)
 George Nelson — STS-41-C (1984), STS-61-C (1985), STS-26 (1988)
 Bill Nelson — STS-61-C (1985)
 James H. Newman* — STS-51 (1993), STS-69 (1995), STS-88 (1998), STS-109 (2002)
 Carlos I. Noriega* — STS-84 (1997), STS-97 (2000)
 Lisa Nowak — STS-121 (2006)
 Karen L. Nyberg — STS-124 (2008), Soyuz TMA-09M (2013)

O 
 Bryan D. O'Connor — STS-61-B (1985), STS-40 (1991)
 Ellen Ochoa, first Hispanic woman in space — STS-56 (1993), STS-66 (1994), STS-96 (1999), STS-110 (2002)
 William Oefelein — STS-116 (2006)
 John D. Olivas — STS-117 (2007), STS-128 (2009)
 Gregory Olsen, third space tourist — Soyuz TMA-7/6 (2005)
 Ellison Onizuka (1946–1986), died on the Challenger — STS-51-C (1985)
 Stephen S. Oswald — STS-42 (1992), STS-56 (1993), STS-67 (1995)
 Robert F. Overmyer (1936–1996) — STS-5 (1982), STS-51-B (1985)

P 
 William Pailes — STS-51-J (1985)
 Scott E. Parazynski — STS-66 (1994), STS-86 (1997), STS-95 (1998), STS-100 (2001), STS-120 (2007)
 Ronald A. Parise (1951–2008) — STS-35 (1990), STS-67 (1995)
 Robert A. Parker — STS-9 (1983), STS-35 (1990)
 Nicholas Patrick* — STS-116 (2006), STS-130 (2010)
 James Pawelczyk — STS-90 (1998)
 Gary Payton — STS-51-C (1985)
 Donald H. Peterson — STS-6 (1983)
 Donald Pettit — STS-113/Soyuz TMA-1 (2002), STS-126 (2008), Soyuz TMA-03M (2011)
 John L. Phillips — STS-100 (2001), Soyuz TMA-6 (2005), STS-119 (2009)
 William R. Pogue — Skylab 4 (1973)
 Alan G. Poindexter (1961–2012) — STS-122 (2008), STS-131 (2010)
 Mark L. Polansky — STS-98 (2001), STS-116 (2006), STS-127 (2009)
 Charles J. Precourt — STS-55 (1993), STS-71 (1995), STS-84 (1997), STS-91 (1998)
Sian Proctor - Inspiration4 (2021)

R 
 William F. Readdy — STS-42 (1992), STS-51 (1993), STS-79 (1996)
 Kenneth S. Reightler, Jr. — STS-48 (1991), STS-60 (1994)
 James F. Reilly — STS-89 (1998), STS-104 (2001), STS-117 (2007)
 Garrett Reisman — STS-123/124 (2008), STS-132 (2010)
 Judith Resnik (1949–1986), died on the Challenger — STS-41-D (1984)
 Paul W. Richards — STS-102 (2001)
 Richard N. Richards — STS-28 (1989), STS-41 (1990), STS-50 (1992), STS-64 (1994)
 Sally Ride (1951–2012), first American woman in space — STS-7 (1983), STS-41-G (1984)
 Stephen Robinson — STS-85 (1997), STS-95 (1998), STS-114 (2005), STS-130 (2010)
 Kent Rominger — STS-73 (1995), STS-80 (1996), STS-85 (1997), STS-96 (1999), STS-100 (2001)
 Stuart Roosa (1933–1994) — Apollo 14 (1971)
 Jerry L. Ross — STS-61-B (1985), STS-27 (1988), STS-37 (1991), STS-55 (1993), STS-74 (1995), STS-88 (1998), STS-110 (2002)
 Kathleen Rubins — Soyuz MS-01 (2016)
Francisco Rubio — Soyuz MS-22 (2022)
 Mario Runco, Jr. — STS-44 (1991), STS-54 (1993), STS-77 (1996)

S 
 Albert Sacco — STS-73 (1995)
 Robert Satcher‚ STS-129 (2009)
 Wally Schirra (1923–2007) — Mercury 8 (1962), Gemini 6A (1965), Apollo 7 (1968)
 Harrison Schmitt (The last, 12th man, who arrived and set foot on the Moon)— Apollo 17 (1972)
 Rusty Schweickart — Apollo 9 (1969)
 Dick Scobee (1939–1986), died on the Challenger — STS-41-C (1984)
 David Scott — Gemini 8 (1966), Apollo 9 (1969), Apollo 15 (1971)
 Winston E. Scott — STS-72 (1996), STS-87 (1997)
 Paul D. Scully-Power* — STS-41-G (1984)
 Richard A. Searfoss — STS-58 (1993), STS-76 (1996), STS-90 (1998)
 Margaret Rhea Seddon — STS-51-D (1985), STS-40 (1991), STS-58 (1993)
 Ronald Sega — STS-60 (1994), STS-76 (1996)
 Piers Sellers* (1955–2016) — STS-112 (2002), STS-121 (2006), STS-132 (2010)
 Christopher Sembroski - Inspiration4 (2021)
 Brewster H. Shaw — STS-9 (1983), STS-61-B (1985), STS-28 (1989)
 Alan Shepard (1923–1998), first American in space — Apollo 14 (1971). Also flew suborbitally in Mercury 3 (1961).
 William Shepherd — STS-27 (1988), STS-41 (1990), STS-52 (1992), Soyuz TM-31 /STS-102 (2001)
 Nancy Sherlock – see Nancy Currie
 Loren Shriver — STS-51-C (1985), STS-31 (1990), STS-46 (1992)
 Charles Simonyi*, fifth space tourist — Soyuz TMA-10/9 (2007), Soyuz TMA-14/13 (2009)
 Deke Slayton (1924–1993) — Apollo-Soyuz Test Project (1975)
 Steven Smith — STS-68 (1994), STS-82 (1997), STS-103 (1999), STS-110 (2002)
 Sherwood C. Spring — STS-61-B (1985)
 Robert C. Springer — STS-29 (1989), STS-38 (1990)
 Thomas Patten Stafford — Gemini 6A (1965), Gemini 9A (1966), Apollo 10 (1969), Apollo-Soyuz Test Project (1975)
 Heidemarie M. Stefanyshyn-Piper — STS-115 (2006), STS-126 (2008)
 Robert L. Stewart — STS-41-B (1984), STS-51-J (1985)
 Susan Still — STS-83 (1997), STS-94 (1997)
 Nicole P. Stott — STS-128/129 (2009), STS-133 (2011)
 Frederick Sturckow — STS-88 (1998), STS-105 (2001), STS-117 (2007), STS-128 (2009)
 Kathryn Dwyer Sullivan, first American woman to walk in space — STS-41-G (1984), STS-31 (1990), STS-45 (1992)
 Steven Swanson — STS-117 (2007), STS-119 (2009)
 John "Jack" Swigert (1931–1982) — Apollo 13 (1970)

T 
 Daniel Tani — STS-108 (2001), STS-120/122 (2007)
 Joseph R. Tanner — STS-66 (1994), STS-82 (1997), STS-97 (2000), STS-115 (2006)
 Norman Thagard — STS-7 (1983), STS-51-B (1985), STS-30 (1989), STS-42 (1992), Soyuz TM-21/STS-71 (1995)
 Andy Thomas* — STS-77 (1996), STS-89 (1998), STS-91 (1998), STS-102 (2001), STS-114 (2005)
 Donald A. Thomas — STS-65 (1994), STS-70 (1995), STS-83 (1997), STS-94 (1997)
 Kathryn C. Thornton, first woman to make multiple EVAs — STS-33 (1989), STS-49 (1992), STS-61 (1993), STS-73 (1995)
 William E. Thornton — STS-8 (1983), STS-51-B (1985)
 Pierre Thuot — STS-36 (1990), STS-49 (1992), STS-62 (1994)
 Scott D. Tingle — Soyuz MS-07 (2017)
 Dennis Tito, first space tourist — Soyuz TM-32/31 (2001)
 Eugene Trinh* — STS-50 (1992)
 Richard H. Truly — STS-2 (1981), STS-8 4 (1983)

V 
 Lodewijk van den Berg* — STS-51-B (1985)
 James van Hoften — STS-41-C (1984), STS-51-I (1985)
 Charles Veach (1944–1995) — STS-39 (1991), STS-52 (1992)
 Terry Virts — STS-130 (2010), Soyuz TMA-15M (2014)
 James S. Voss — STS-44 (1991), STS-53 (1992), STS-69 (1995), STS-101 (2000), STS-102/105 (2001)
 Janice E. Voss (1956–2012) — STS-57 (1993), STS-63 (1995), STS-83 (1997), STS-94 (1997), STS-99 (2000)

W 
 Rex J. Walheim — STS-110 (2002), STS-122 (2008), STS-135 (2011)
 Charles Walker — STS-41-D (1984), STS-51-D (1985), STS-61-B (1985)
 David M. Walker (1944–2001) — STS-51-A (1984), STS-30 (1989), STS-53 (1992), STS-69 (1995)
 Shannon Walker — Soyuz TMA-19 (2010), SpaceX Crew-1 (2020)
 Carl Walz — STS-51 (1993), STS-65 (1994), STS-79 (1996), STS-108/111 (2001)
 Taylor Wang* — STS-51-B (1985)
 Mary E. Weber — STS-70 (1995), STS-101 (2000)
 Jessica Watkins — SpaceX Crew-4 (2022)
 Paul J. Weitz — Skylab 2, STS-6 (1983)
 Jim Wetherbee — STS-32 (1990), STS-52 (1992), STS-63 (1995), STS-86, STS-102 (2001), STS-113 (2002)
 Douglas H. Wheelock — STS-120 (2007), Soyuz TMA-19 (2010)
 Ed White (1930–1967), first American to perform an EVA. Died in the Apollo 1 (1967) (1967) disaster — Gemini 4 (1965)
 Peggy Whitson, holds the American record for time spent in space — STS-111/113 (2002), Soyuz TMA-11 (2007), Soyuz MS-03 (2016)
 Terrence Wilcutt — STS-68 (1994), STS-79 (1996), STS-89 (1998), STS-106 (2000)
 Donald Williams — STS-51-D (1985), STS-34 (1989)
 Jeffrey Williams — STS-101 (2000), Soyuz TMA-8 (2006), Soyuz TMA-16 (2009), Soyuz TMA-20M (2016)
 Sunita Williams, holder of the women's spacewalk record — STS-116/117 (2006), Soyuz TMA-05M (2012)
 Barry E. Wilmore — STS-129 (2009), Soyuz TMA-14M (2014)
 Stephanie Wilson — STS-121 (2006), STS-120 (2007), STS-131 (2010)
 Gregory R. Wiseman — Soyuz TMA-13M (2014)
 Peter Wisoff — STS-57 (1993), STS-68 (1994), STS-81 (1997), STS-92 (2000)
 David Wolf — STS-58 (1993), STS-86/89, STS-112 (2002), STS-127 (2009)
 Alfred Worden — Apollo 15 (1971)

Y 
 John Young (1930–2018) — Gemini 3 (1965), Gemini 10 (1966), Apollo 10 (1969), Apollo 16 (1972), STS-1 (1981), STS-9 (1983)

Z 
 George D. Zamka — STS-120 (2007), STS-130 (2010)

Americans born abroad
 William Anders, born in Hong Kong to American parents.
 Gregory Chamitoff, born in Montreal, Quebec, Canada.
 Michael Collins, born in Rome, Italy to American parents. 
 Richard Garriott, born in Cambridge, England.
 Gregory H. Johnson, born in South Ruislip, England.
 Frederick W. Leslie, born in Ancón, Panama Canal Zone (now Panama).
 Kjell N. Lindgren, born in Taipei, Taiwan.
 Shannon Lucid, born in Shanghai, China (then under Japanese rule) to American parents.
 James H. Newman, born in the United Nations Trust Territory of the Pacific Islands (now Micronesia).

Naturalized Americans
 Anousheh Ansari, born in Mashhad, Iran. First Iranian-American in space. Fourth space tourist and first female space tourist.
 Franklin Chang-Diaz, born in San José, Costa Rica. First Costa Rican-American in space.
 Kalpana Chawla, born in Karnal, India. First Indian-American in space.
 Michael Foale, born in Louth, England, dual British and American citizen.
 Michael Lopez-Alegria, born in Madrid, Spain. 
 Carlos I. Noriega, born in Lima, Peru. First Peruvian-born person in space.
 Nicholas Patrick, born in Saltburn-by-the-Sea, England, dual UK-US citizen.
 Paul Scully-Power, born in Sydney, Australia.
 Piers Sellers, born in Crowborough, England, dual UK-US citizen.
 Charles Simonyi, born in Budapest, Hungary. Fifth space tourist.
 Andrew Thomas, born in Adelaide, Australia.
 Eugene Trinh, born in Saigon, State of Vietnam (now Ho Chi Minh City, Vietnam). First Vietnamese-American in space. 
 Lodewijk van den Berg, born in Sluiskil, the Netherlands. 
 Taylor Wang, born in Shanghai, China. First Chinese American in space.

Vietnam
 Phạm Tuân (Intercosmos), first Vietnamese and first Asian in space. — Soyuz 37 (1980)/36 (1980)

See also
 Astronaut birthplaces by US state
 Dead astronauts
 List of space travelers by name
 Timeline of space travel by nationality

Notes
*Due to the rise of space tourism (predominately done through private companies, such as but not limited to: Space X and Virgin) this list may change or may become outdated .

 Space travelers by nationality